Maureen Clark (born December 20, 1982 as Maureen Brunt) is an American curler. She began curling at the age of 5 at the Portage Curling Club, a few blocks from her home.

Career
Clark began curling competitively at the age of 14. She was the skip of her high school curling team all four years. She also led her team to a state championship in 2000 and 2001. Clark's first National Junior Championship appearance was in 1999 where she placed sixth. In the fall of 2001 she was the newest addition to the Cassie Johnson's team, where she played lead. The Johnson Team were the Junior National Champions in 2002 and 2003. Clark, along with teammates Cassie Johnson, Jamie Johnson, and Katie Beck, were the first junior women from the United States to win a gold medal at the World Junior Championships, in 2002. In 2003 Johnson, Beck, and Clark returned to the World Juniors where they claimed the silver medal, losing to Canada in the final.

In 2005 Clark and teammates Cassie Johnson, Jamie Johnson, and new addition Jessica Schultz were the Women's National Champions, awarding them the right to represent the United States in the 2006 Turin Winter Olympics and 2005 World Championships. At the World Championships, held in Paisley, Scotland, the team won the silver medal. The team's only losses of the week were against Annette Norberg Swedish team, the second time in the final. While expecting a strong finish at the Turin Olympics with the silver medal win the previous year at World's, the Johnson team had a disappointing performance, finishing with a record of 2–7.

Clark returned to the National Women's Championships four more times after the Olympics, earning a silver medal in 2007 when they lost to Debbie McCormmick in the final. Clark then joined Debbie McCormick's as alternate for the 2007 World Championships in Aomori, Japan.

Personal life
Her brother is Ryan Brunt, who competed in the 2011 Ford World Men's Curling Championship as Pete Fenson's lead.

She married Jason Clark in 2010.

Teams

References

External links 
 

Living people
1982 births
People from Portage, Wisconsin
American female curlers
Curlers at the 2006 Winter Olympics
Olympic curlers of the United States
American curling champions